Bardsey railway station was a railway station on the Cross Gates to Wetherby line serving the village of Bardsey, West Yorkshire connecting it with the town of Wetherby to the North and the city of Leeds to the south. The station opened in 1876 and closed, along with the line, following the Beeching axe in 1964.

References

Lines

Disused railway stations in Leeds
Beeching closures in England
Former North Eastern Railway (UK) stations
Railway stations in Great Britain opened in 1876
Railway stations in Great Britain closed in 1964